The Bender Uprising was organized by local Bolshevik groups in Bender/Tighina on 27 May 1919, as a protest of the local Russian population against the annexation of Bessarabia by the Kingdom of Romania in December 1918 (united in a federation with Romania since April 1918, Bessarabia was annexed by the latter on 10 December). Together, the Ukrainian troops and the rebels captured the local railway station, post office and telegraph office. During that evening, however, the Romanian Army together with a unit of French colonial troops arrived at the scene and swiftly suppressed the uprising. Although many rebels fled across the Dniester River, at least 150 of them were captured and executed.

See also
 Bessarabian question

References

1919 in Romania
Aftermath of World War I in Romania
Allied intervention in the Russian Civil War
Bender, Moldova
Communist rebellions
Conflicts in 1919
May 1919 events
Greater Romania
History of Bessarabia
Riots and civil disorder in Moldova